The , signed as Route 1, is one of the tolled routes of the Shuto Expressway system serving the Greater Tokyo Area. It is one two expressways signed as Route 1 in the system, the other expressway signed as Route 1 is the Ueno Route. It connects Tokyo's Inner Circular Route in central Tokyo to Haneda International Airport, one of the Tokyo area's two international airports, as well as the Yokohane Route, which leads to Kawasaki and Yokohama in Kanagawa Prefecture.

History
The Haneda Route was opened in four stages during the 1960s. The first section of the Haneda Route between Hamazakibashi and Shibaura was opened to traffic on 20 December 1962. The second section to be completed between Shibaura and Suzugamori was finished on 21 December 1963. The third section between Suzugamori and Haneda-nishi was opened on 2 August 1964. The fourth and final section between Haneda-nishi and Haneda was opened on 21 December 1966.

Junction list

See also

References

External links

1-Haneda
1963 establishments in Japan
Roads in Tokyo